Aciagrion is a genus of damselfly in the family Coenagrionidae.
Aciagrion are small and slender damselflies with a small head. 
They are found at still waters including swamps. Aciagrion is widely distributed in the tropics from Africa, through Indonesia to Australia.
They are commonly known as Slims.

Species 
The genus Aciagrion includes the following species:
Aciagrion africanum 
Aciagrion approximans 
Aciagrion azureum 
Aciagrion balachowskyi 
Aciagrion borneense 
Aciagrion brosseti 
Aciagrion congoense 
Aciagrion dondoense  - Opal Slim
Aciagrion fasciculare 
Aciagrion feuerborni 
Aciagrion fragilis  - Blue Slim
Aciagrion gracile 
Aciagrion hamoni 
Aciagrion heterosticta 
Aciagrion hisopa 
Aciagrion huaanensis 
Aciagrion karamoja 
Aciagrion macrootithenae 
Aciagrion migratum 
Aciagrion nodosum 
Aciagrion occidentale 
Aciagrion olympicum 
Aciagrion pallidum 
Aciagrion pinheyi  - Emerald-striped Slim
Aciagrion rarum 
Aciagrion steeleae 
Aciagrion tillyardi 
Aciagrion tonsillare 
Aciagrion walteri 
Aciagrion zambiense

References

Coenagrionidae
Zygoptera genera
Odonata of Asia
Odonata of Africa
Odonata of Australia
Taxa named by Edmond de Sélys Longchamps
Insects described in 1891
Damselflies
Taxonomy articles created by Polbot